Atenia quadrasi is a species of air-breathing land snail, terrestrial pulmonate gastropod mollusks in the family Helicodontidae.  

This species is endemic to Spain.

References

 Hidalgo, J. G. (1885). Description d'une nouvelle espèce d'Helix d'Espagne. Journal de Conchyliologie. 33: 193-195, pl. 9. Paris.
 Bank, R. A.; Neubert, E. (2017). Checklist of the land and freshwater Gastropoda of Europe. Last update: July 16th, 2017.
 Gittenberger, E. (1968). Zur Systematik der in die Gattung Trissexodon Pilsbry (Helicidae, Helicodontinae) gerechneten Arten. Zoologische Mededelingen. 43 (13): 166-172. Leiden.

Atenia
Endemic fauna of Spain
Gastropods described in 1885
Endemic molluscs of the Iberian Peninsula
Taxonomy articles created by Polbot